The N72 road is a national secondary road in Ireland that runs east-west from its junction with the N25 near Dungarvan in County Waterford  to the N70 in Killorglin in County Kerry.

The road passes through Lismore – Fermoy (M8) – Mallow (N20) – Rathmore – Killarney (N22) – Killorglin.  

The N72 is 165.923 km long.

Route
Like most national secondary roads, the N72 is mainly a single carriageway two-lane road. Some stretches are narrow with sharp bends. The N72 begins in County Waterford at the N25 near Dungarvan. Travelling west from there to Cappoquin the road is single carriageway. From Cappoquin to Lismore the road is of good quality, with hard shoulders and a good surface. Past Lismore the road is of poorer quality, travelling via Tallowbridge and Fermoy to Mallow in County Cork. Some sections between Fermoy and Mallow are narrow with sharp bends and few hard shoulders. The section from Mallow to the R579 junction (Banteer) has hard shoulders. After the R579 junction, this section of the N72 has no hard shoulders until it joins the N22 in County Kerry, east of Killarney.  Further west, after bypassing Killarney, the N72 leaves the N22 again, becoming part of the Ring of Kerry route to Killorglin, where the road terminates at the N70. When the N72 leaves the N22, it reaches its roundabout with the N71 which goes to Kenmare.

Proposed upgrades
Funding of €2.4 million has been secured in 2011 for realignment of a particularly accident-prone stretch of the N72.

See also
Roads in Ireland 
Motorways in Ireland
National primary road
Regional road

References

Roads Act 1993 (Classification of National Roads) Order 2006 – Department of Transport

National secondary roads in the Republic of Ireland
Roads in County Cork
Roads in County Kerry